Tha Cum Up is the second studio album by American rapper Sylk-E. Fyne. It was released on July 11, 2000, via Rufftown Records. The ten track record featured guest appearances from Nicole Renée, JT Money, Bizzy Bone, Phantom Smoove, Chill, and Snoop Dogg.

After her successful debut, Raw Sylk, expectations were high but Tha Cum Up was a critical and commercial failure, however, the single "Ya Style", featuring Snoop Dogg and Bizzy Bone, made it to #17 on the Hot Rap Singles.

Track listing

Personnel
Calvin Broadus - featured artist (track 9)
La'Mar Lorraine Johnson - main artist
Bryon Anthony McCane II - featured artist (track 9)
Nicole Renée - featured artist (track 8)
Bruce Swedien - producer
Rene Swedien - producer
Jeff Thompkins - featured artist (track 7)
Jonathan West - featured artist (track 6)
Chill - featured artist (track 2)
Phantom Smoove - featured artist (track 4)

References

2000 albums
Sylk-E. Fyne albums